The Committee on the Interior, General Affairs and the Civil Service, more commonly referred to as the Committee on the Interior, is a standing committee of the Belgian Chamber of Representatives. It is responsible for all matters related to the internal affairs of Belgium.

References

Interior, Committee on the